Monochrome for Austin is an outdoor sculpture by Nancy Rubins, installed outside the Hackerman Building on the University of Texas at Austin campus, in the U.S. state of Texas. The 50-foot-tall work was installed in 2015 as part of the university's Landmarks public art program.

See also 

 2015 in art

References 

2015 establishments in Texas
2015 sculptures
Outdoor sculptures in Austin, Texas
University of Texas at Austin campus